Gibraltar rock, Gibraltars, or Salem Gibralter is an old-fashioned candy associated with Salem, Massachusetts in the United States.

The Gibraltar  was the first candy commercially sold in the United States. It is still being sold as of 2023.

History
The Salem Gibraltar was originated by the Spencer family of northern Salem, Massachusetts in 1806, after they relocated from England. A shipwreck left them destitute,  so that their neighbors donated them supplies; they included a barrel of sugar since Mrs. Spencer was a confectioner. She first sold her lemon or peppermint  flavored hard candy on the steps of the First Church herself, until they became so popular that she was able to purchase a horse and wagon to sell them to neighboring towns.

According to a 1947 cookbook, Salem native Nathaniel Hawthorne wrote in his notebook of their having 

As hard candy remains stable indefinitely if kept dry, captains of commercial ships in turn could carry the candy to ports throughout the world for sale.

After Mrs. Spencer died, the business remained in family hands until the 1830s, when it was sold to John William Pepper.

Recipe

Ye Olde Pepper Companie continues to sell the candies, apparently using the original recipe as "Gibralters"[sic] and lists sugar, water, cream of tartar, cornstarch, and oil of lemon as ingredients. They are cut into the shape of a rhombus about 1½ inches on a side.

A 1947 cookbook gives a recipe using sugar, water, vinegar, and either vanilla, peppermint or cloves for flavoring; it is boiled until hard then pulled like taffy, and becomes "soft and creamy" in several days.

Literary footprint
An 1893 book about Salem calls Gibraltars, together with molasses "black-jacks", "two Salem institutions" and says 

She says the lemon flavor is preferred by youth, and the peppermint by the elderly, and quotes a "charming old Salem dame" as saying "I know I must be growing old, because a peppermint Gibraltar is so comforting to me."

Gibraltar candies are mentioned in Nathaniel Hawthorne's novel The House of the Seven Gables, published in 1851. In the book, a character named Hepzibah Pyncheon operates a little "cent-shop" which contained "a glass pickle-jar, filled with fragments of Gibraltar rock; not, indeed, splinters of the veritable stone foundation of the famous fortress, but bits of delectable candy, neatly done up in white paper." His story "The Old Apple-Dealer", collected in Mosses from an Old Manse, similarly mentions "that delectable condiment, known by children as Gibraltar rock."

See also
 The House of the Seven Gables

References

External links
 Ye Olde Pepper Candy Companie, America's Oldest Candy Company 
 Company History Page

Salem, Massachusetts
Brand name confectionery